David Taylor (17 September 1940 – 12 March 2017) was an English footballer who played as an inside forward.

Taylor started his career at Gillingham where he played 21 appearances in the Football League scoring 3 goals, before leaving for Portsmouth where he made a further two Football League appearances. At the end of the 1959–60 season, Taylor dropped into non-league football joining Southern Football League side Yeovil Town. In nine seasons with Yeovil, Taylor scored 284 goals in 436 matches setting a post-war club record as top scorer. Taylor left Yeovil in April 1969, signing for their local rivals Bath City scoring a further 46 goals in 149 appearances before his departure in November 1971 for Cheltenham Town.

Taylor died in March 2017 aged 76.

References

1940 births
2017 deaths
People from Rochester, Kent
English footballers
Association football forwards
Gillingham F.C. players
Portsmouth F.C. players
Yeovil Town F.C. players
Bath City F.C. players
Cheltenham Town F.C. players
English Football League players